Harold Martín López Granizo (born 3 December 2000) is an Ecuadorian road cyclist, who currently rides for UCI Continental team .

Major results
2019
 1st Stage 7 Vuelta a Costa Rica
2020
 3rd Overall Vuelta al Ecuador
 8th Overall Vuelta a Guatemala
1st Stages 6 & 8
2021
 National Under-23 Road Championships
1st  Time trial
2nd Road race
 2nd  Road race, Pan American Youth Games
2022
 9th Strade Bianche di Romagna

References

External links

2000 births
Living people
Ecuadorian male cyclists
People from Ibarra, Ecuador
21st-century Ecuadorian people